) is the flagship television newscast of TV Globo. First airing on September 1, 1969, according to IBOPE (Brazilian Institute of Public Opinion and Statistics), in the week of September 28October 4, 2015, it was the second most watched program in Brazilian television, with an average of 26,007,251 viewers per minute (roughly 12.5% of the Brazilian population) and for 5.5 million people worldwide via Globo International.

History 

 premiered on September 1, 1969, hosted by Hilton Gomes and Cid Moreira, the first Rio de Janeiro-produced newscast to be shown nationwide. Months later, the program featured the network's first female weekend presenter Márcia Mendes.

During the 1970s,  preferred to emphasize international news and sports. The British documentary Beyond Citizen Kane suggests that this happened so that Globo wouldn't have to report the repression of the Brazilian military government, which would have provided a substantial part of the network's growth. Despite this, the program introduced some innovations (color broadcasts in 1970, via satellite reports in 1973, live reports in 1976 and videotape footage in 1977).

Through the 1980s, three episodes involving the program caused controversy. In 1982,  coverage of the state elections of Rio de Janeiro was accused of participating in a plot to fraud the elections. According to former Rede Globo employee Roméro da Costa Machado, Leonel Brizola, a candidate of the opposition to the military regime, was a politician historically persecuted by Rede Globo owner Roberto Marinho. Two years later, the program was accused of omitting information about the Diretas Já, a popular campaign for the resuming of the direct election for president, near the end of dictatorship. Finally, in 1989,  was accused of editing a presidential debate between runoff candidates Fernando Collor and Luis Inacio Lula da Silva in order to favour Collor. This episode is also extensively debated on Beyond Citizen Kane.

In the 1990s, the quality of Rede Globo's journalism increased dramatically.  presented its viewers breaking stories such as police brutality at favelas, an interview with Paulo César Farias when he was on the run from the law, corruption cases on the social security, the kicking of the saint incident among several others.

In recent days, after the death of Marinho, Rede Globo's journalism again declined in quality.  has preferred to broadcast stories produced on the Southeast, in spite of Globo having affiliates in every Brazilian state. During the Mensalão scandal and the 2006 general elections,  was once again accused of airing anti-Lula biased news. In November 2005, host William Bonner caused controversy after he compared the average  viewer with Homer Simpson, the ignorant main character of the American animated series The Simpsons.

As part of Rede Globo's 50th anniversary,  was in 2015 given a brand new look and a brand new intro, however, the theme tune will remain unchanged. Between March 17 and April 27 that year, the newscast aired on chroma key.

On June 19, 2017,  introduced a new set in the middle of a newsroom at Globo's Rio de Janeiro headquarters, which features a curved glass backdrop that can be used with laser projectors for background graphics, and augmented reality effects.

Just months afterward, as a result of the coronavirus pandemic, the network news division decided that Bonner become the alternate Saturday presenter, while overall presentation duties were assumed by reporters from the flagship station in Rio de Janeiro full time instead of São Paulo or Brasilla-based ones, with a four-person team appointed to alternate by twos the presentation of the Saturday edition, unless extraordinary news coverages on Saturdays (including sports events) warrant the presence of the weekday presenter team. Two more joined the Saturday pool for the 2021 season.

Hosts 
After over 50 years of broadcast, several reporters hosted . Hilton Gomes and Cid Moreira were the first hosts. In 1971, Sérgio Chapelin replaced Gomes and joined Moreira as the longest-running duo of  hosts. In 1983, Chapelin was replaced by Celso Freitas. Chapelin returned in 1989, hosting again with Moreira until 1996. In that year, William Bonner and Lillian Witte Fibe began serving as hosts. From 1998 and prior to December 5, 2011, Witte Fibe was replaced by Bonner's now ex-wife, Fátima Bernardes. Bonner and Bernardes recently tied with Chapelin and Moreira as the longest-running duo of  hosts. From October 31, 2014, the former host of Fantástico, Renata Vasconcellos replaced Patrícia Poeta (who also replaced Fátima) and joined Bonner as the current hosts of this programme.

Main presenters  
 Hilton Gomes (1969–1971)
 Cid Moreira (1969–1996)
 Ronaldo Rosas (1971-1972)
 Sérgio Chapelin (1972–1983; 1989–1996)
 Celso Freitas (1983–1989)
 William Bonner (since 1996)
 Lillian Witte Fibe (1996–1998)
 Fátima Bernardes (1998–2011)
 Patrícia Poeta (2011–2014)
 Renata Vasconcellos (since 2014)

Weather forecasting 
 Fabiana Scaranzi (2000–2004)
 Rosana Jatobá (2004–2013)
 Flávia Freire (2012-2013)
 Michelle Loreto (2013-2015)
 Maria Júlia Coutinho (2015-2019)
 Anne Lottermann (2019-2021)
 Eliana Marques (Since 2021)

Relief presenters 
 Heraldo Pereira (since 2002)
 Ana Paula Araújo (since 2011)
 Giuliana Morrone (since 2015)
 Ana Luiza Guimarães (since 2017)
 César Tralli (since 2018)
 Flávio Fachel (since 2019)
 Márcio Bonfim (since 2020)
 Roberto Kovalick (since 2020)
 Aline Aguiar (since 2020)
 Jessica Senra (since 2020)
 André Trigueiro (since 2020)
 Helter Duarte (since 2020)
 Mariana Gross (since 2020)
 Aline Midlej (since 2021)
 Paulo Renato Soares (since 2021)

Special Relief presenters for the 50th golden anniversary season  
 Ayres Rocha (Acre)
Filipe Todelo (Alagoas)
 Aline Ferreira (Amapá) 
Luana Borba (Amazonas)
Jéssica Senra (Bahia)
Taís Lopes (Ceará)
Philipe Lemos (Espírito Santo) 
Fábio William (Federal District) 
 Matheus Ribeiro (Goiás)
 Giovanni Spinucci (Maranhão)
 Luzimar Collares (Mato Grosso)
Lucimar Lescano (Mato Grosso do Sul)
Aline Aguiar (Minas Gerais)
Priscilla Castro (Pará)
 Sandro Dalpícolo (Paraná)
 Larissa Pereira (Paraíba)
 Marcelo Magno (Piauí)
 Márcio Bonfim (Pernambuco)
 Cristina Ranzolin (Rio Grande do Sul)
Lídia Pace (Rio Grande do Norte)
 Ellen Ferreira (Roraima)
Ana Lídia Daíbes (Rondônia)
 Fabian Londero (Santa Catarina)
 Carlos Tramontina (São Paulo)
 Lyderwan Santos (Sergipe)
 Mariana Gross (Rio de Janeiro)
 Thiago Rogeh (Tocantins)

Ratings

Criticism 
Some of the news aired by Jornal Nacional are criticized for not representing all points of view, manipulating news and being sensationalist.

References

External links 
Jornal Nacional official website
 

Brazilian television news shows
Rede Globo original programming
1969 in Brazilian television
1969 Brazilian television series debuts
1960s Brazilian television series
1970s Brazilian television series
1980s Brazilian television series
1990s Brazilian television series
2000s Brazilian television series
2010s Brazilian television series
2020s Brazilian television series
International Emmy Awards Current Affairs & News winners
Portuguese-language television shows
Flagship evening news shows
Television series produced in Rio de Janeiro